Joel Bernstein is a photographer, guitarist, and record producer based in Oakland, California. His photographs have appeared as the album covers to, among others, After the Gold Rush, 4 Way Street, Rita Coolidge, Wind on the Water, Running on Empty, CSN, Bob Dylan at Budokan, Rust Never Sleeps, Shadows and Light, and Hard Promises. His photographs have been published in Time, The New York Times, and Rolling Stone, among other publications, and there have been retrospective exhibits of his work in New York City, San Francisco, Los Angeles, and London.
As a guitarist, he is most noted for support work to his friends David Crosby and Graham Nash, both individually and on their Crosby & Nash records. He has acted as co-producer and archivist with Nash for Crosby, Stills, Nash & Young, and is responsible with Nash for the compilation and production of the box sets Voyage for Crosby, Reflections for Nash, Carry On for Stephen Stills, and CSNY 1974 for the band's tour of that year.

In 2018 Joel Bernstein was inducted into the International Photography Hall of Fame and Museum.

References

1952 births
Living people
American photographers
Musicians from Oakland, California